Chajak station is a railway station in Chajak-tong, Kaech'ŏn municipal city, South P'yŏngan province, North Korea on the Manp'o Line of the Korean State Railway; it is also the starting point of the Kaech'ŏn Colliery Line to Chŏnjin.

History

The station was opened on 15 October 1933 by the Chosen Government Railway, along with the rest of the third section of the Manp'o Line from Kaech'ŏn to Kujang.

References

Railway stations in North Korea
Railway stations opened in 1933
1933 establishments in Korea
Buildings and structures in South Pyongan Province